Darren Reisig (born March 23, 1968 in Victoria, British Columbia) is a former professional lacrosse player and was recently an assistant coach of the Victoria Shamrocks. Darren is also a teacher and athletic director at Claremont Secondary School. He runs the Claremont Sports Institute for aquatics, golf, rowing and lacrosse. Darren is the head coach of the lacrosse program as well as coaching golf and girls junior basketball.

Darren also runs the BC's Best Lacrosse Player Showcase tournament which hosts the top 150 high school field lacrosse players in the province, along with coaches representing colleges from all across the U.S. This tournament is usually held in June.
In August Darren, and Fred Jenner run Camp Rocks summer field lacrosse camps.

NLL career
Reisig began his NLL career with the Vancouver Ravens in the 2002 NLL season.  He was appointed the Vancouver Ravens' first captain prior to their opening game on November 17, 2001 in Toronto. Reisig played for the Ravens until 2004, and has since played for the San Jose Stealth and the Portland LumberJax.

Reisig was named to the North team for the All-Star game in the 2002 NLL season.

WLA career
Reisig played with the Victoria Shamrocks of the Western Lacrosse Association from 1989 to 2003, helping the Shamrocks to Mann Cup national titles in 1997, 1999 and 2003. He was the captain of the Mann Cup-winning Shamrocks in 2003.

International lacrosse career
 1994 - Member of Team Canada, 3rd place at the World Lacrosse Championship
 1998 - Member of Team Canada, 1998 World Lacrosse Championship Final

Junior lacrosse career
Reisig played for the Esquimalt Legion lacrosse team in the BCJALL from 1985 to 1989 and led his teams to league titles in 1985, 1986, 1988 and 1989. In 1987 they actually tied for the league lead in points with the Coquitlam Adanacs. The Esquimalt Legion team won the Provincial Championship consecutively from 1985 through 1988. In 1989 Reisig was named as a first team all-star and was the team top scorer

Statistics

NLL

Awards
 1987 Esquimalt Legion - Rookie of the Year
 1989 Esquimalt Legion - Top Scorer
 1989 BCJALL First Team All-star
 1995 WLA Three Star Award
 1995 WLA MVP

References
 http://www.victoriashamrocks.ca/
 http://www.claremont.sd63.bc.ca/index.php?pageid=126
 https://web.archive.org/web/20070927190416/http://www.sd61.bc.ca/athleticassoc/lvimembers.htm
 https://web.archive.org/web/20071009083022/http://www.portlandjax.com/news_article.php?id=502
 http://saanichlax.saanichlacrosse.com/clubs/1651/announcements/647486-Camp-Rocks-September
 https://web.archive.org/web/20160406143501/http://www.bcjall.com/sp-datastore/alumni/2014/2014_Career_Points.htm

1968 births
National Lacrosse League All-Stars
Canadian lacrosse players
Lacrosse people from British Columbia
Living people
Major League Lacrosse players
Portland LumberJax players
San Jose Stealth players
Sportspeople from Victoria, British Columbia